Ramaz Chochisvili (born 14 November 1975) is a Georgian judoka. He formerly competed for Ukraine.

Achievements

References

1975 births
Living people
Male judoka from Georgia (country)
Ukrainian male judoka
Universiade medalists in judo
Universiade medalists for Georgia (country)
Medalists at the 1999 Summer Universiade